Callichroma sericeum is a species of beetle in the family Cerambycidae. It was described by Johan Christian Fabricius in 1792. It is known from southeastern Brazil, Paraguay, Argentina, Uruguay, and Bolivia.

References

Callichromatini
Beetles described in 1792
Fauna of Bolivia
Insects of South America